The Montenegrin PEN Center is the national chapter of the International PEN in Montenegro. It was formed in 1990, as one-party Communist rule in what was then Yugoslavia was ending.

The center has worked to promote the use of the Montenegrin language. It published Vojislav Nikčević's Crnogorski pravopis in 1997, the first orthography for Montenegrin.

References

Montenegrin culture